Zygobarinus is a genus of flower weevils in the beetle family Curculionidae. There is one described species in Zygobarinus, Z. coelestinus.

References

Further reading

 
 
 

Baridinae
Monotypic weevil genera
Articles created by Qbugbot